José-Karl Pierre-Fanfan (born 26 July 1975) is a French former professional footballer who played as a centre-back.

Career
A central defender, Pierre-Fanfan was born in Saint-Pol-sur-Mer and began his career at USL Dunkerque, where he played for four seasons before earning a move to RC Lens. In his first season at Lens he helped them to the French title and played a key role in the clubs run to the UEFA Cup semi-final in 2000.

He joined AS Monaco in 2001, then moved to Paris Saint-Germain in 2004, where he played in the 2004–05 UEFA Champions League campaign.

On 6 July 2005, Fanfan signed for Scottish Premier League club Rangers on a free transfer. After scoring in Rangers' 3–0 defeat of Livingston on his debut, he fell out of favour with Alex McLeish and hardly played a game after September; his final appearance in a Rangers shirt came in November 2005 against Celtic. Incoming Ibrox manager Paul Le Guen deemed him surplus to requirements in July 2006 and he was released on 31 August, hours before the closure of the transfer window.

After being more than a year without a club, he joined Al-Sailiya from Qatar for a spell. In June 2009 Fanfan announced his retirement from football.

Because of his Martiniquais background, Fanfan qualifies to play for their national team.

Honours
RC Lens
Ligue 1: 1997-98

Paris Saint-Germain
Coupe de France: 2003–04

References

External links

1975 births
Living people
French people of Martiniquais descent
People from Saint-Pol-sur-Mer
Sportspeople from Nord (French department)
Association football central defenders
French footballers
Martiniquais footballers
French expatriate footballers
RC Lens players
AS Monaco FC players
Paris Saint-Germain F.C. players
Rangers F.C. players
Al-Sailiya SC players
Ligue 1 players
Scottish Premier League players
Qatar Stars League players
Expatriate footballers in Scotland
French expatriate sportspeople in Qatar
French expatriate sportspeople in Scotland
Footballers from Hauts-de-France